Vexillum plurinotatum is a species of small sea snail, marine gastropod mollusk in the family Costellariidae, the ribbed miters.

Description
The length of the shell attains 4 mm.

Distribution
This marine species occurs off Japan.

References

External links
 Hervier, J. (1898). Descriptions d'espèces nouvelles de l'archipel de la Nouvelle-Calédonie. Journal de Conchyliologie. 45(4): 225–248, pls 8-9

plurinotatum
Gastropods described in 1897